The year 1536 in science and technology included a number of events, some of which are listed here.

Botany
 Charles Estienne publishes Seminarium, et Plantarium fructiferarum praesertim arborum quae post hortos conseri solent, Denuo auctum & locupletatum. Huic accessit alter libellus de conserendis arboribus in seminario: deque iis in plantarium transserendis atque inserendis in Paris.
 Jean Ruelle publishes De Natura stirpium libri tres in Paris, the first general descriptive botany to be printed.

Exploration
 July 15 – Jacques Cartier's expedition returns to Saint-Malo.
 End of Álvar Núñez Cabeza de Vaca's expedition in the Americas.

Mathematics
 Adam Ries publishes his book of tables for calculating everyday prices Ein Gerechent Büchlein auff den Schöffel Eimer vnd Pfundtgewicht…

Physiology and medicine
 German physician Johann Dryander (Eichmann) publishes Anatomia capitis humani in Marburg, the first book on the anatomy of the human head.
 Charles Estienne publishes De vasculis libellus, adulescentulorum causa ex Baysio decerptus. Addita vulgari Latinarum vocum interpretatione in Paris and De re vestiaria libellus, ex Bayfio excerptus: addita vulgaris linguae interpretatione, in adulescentulorum gratiam atque utilitatem in Lyon.
 Paracelsus publishes his work on surgery, Die grosse Wundartzney, in Ulm.
 Sir Thomas Elyot publishes his popular medical text, The Castel of Helth, in London.

Births
 April – Ignazio Danti, Italian mathematician and astronomer (died 1586).
 October 28 – Felix Plater, Swiss physician (died 1614).
 Juan de Fuca, Greek navigator (died 1602).
 Henri de Monantheuil, French mathematician and physician (died 1606).
 Roger Marbeck, English royal physician (died 1605).
 approx. date – Juan Fernández, Spanish explorer (died c. 1604).

Deaths
 Baldassare Peruzzi, Sienese architect (born 1481).

References

 
16th century in science
1530s in science